Jared Kiran Panchia (born 18 October 1993) is a New Zealand field hockey player who plays as a forward or midfielder for the New Zealand national team.

Life and career
Panchia was born on 18 October 1993 in Auckland to Peter Panchia and Ramila. Both his parents played field hockey at local level. Panchia's siblings are also field hockey players; his elder brother Arun Panchia has captained the national side, while younger brother Daniel Panchia has represented the national junior team. He has a younger sister, Anjali, who has also taken up the sport. The Panchia family have Gujarati ancestry, with Panchia's great-grandfather emigrating from India to New Zealand in the 1920s.

Panchia was part of the New Zealand U21 squad that took part in the 2013 Men's Hockey Junior World Cup in New Delhi. He made his senior team debut the same year and was the youngest member of the national squad at the 2014 Men's Hockey World Cup in The Hague. Panchia was part of two Oceania Cup silver medal-winning teams: 2013 in Stratford and 2017 in Sydney.

References

External links

Player profile at hockeynz.co.nz

1993 births
Living people
New Zealand male field hockey players
Field hockey players from Auckland
New Zealand sportspeople of Indian descent
Male field hockey midfielders
Male field hockey forwards
2014 Men's Hockey World Cup players
Field hockey players at the 2018 Commonwealth Games
2018 Men's Hockey World Cup players
Commonwealth Games silver medallists for New Zealand
Commonwealth Games medallists in field hockey
Field hockey players at the 2020 Summer Olympics
Olympic field hockey players of New Zealand
Medallists at the 2018 Commonwealth Games